Isabelle Nylander (born 20 April 1990 in Stockholm) is a Swedish former competitive figure skater. Coached by Marie Olsson, she competed twice at the World Junior Championships, in 2005 and 2006. She is the twin sister of Amanda Nylander, who also competed in figure skating.

Programs

Results

References

External links
 

1990 births
Living people
Swedish female single skaters
Sportspeople from Stockholm
21st-century Swedish women